The geography and climate of Bolivia has led to the formation a wide variety of lakes, from salt saturated lakes in the Altiplano to oxbow lakes in the eastern lowlands. Many of Bolivias lakes are formed only seasonally during the austral summer and remains for the rest of the year as salt flats in the altiplano or swamps in the eastern lowlands.

Lakes in the Altiplano basin
All major lakes in the Altiplano belong to the same endorheic basin that when supplied with enough water ends at Salar de Uyuni. Many of the lakes in the altiplano show large fluctuations in area like Poopó Lake that has dried up several times through history. The salt flats of Coipasa and Uyuni have only very small surfaces where water can be observed through all year but are covered each year in summer by up to one meter of water.

Lakes in the lowlands

Lakes by department

Example

Notes 

Bolivia
Lakes